The Russell family is an American family from Georgia that has held prominent positions both in the United States government and the Georgia government. The family was a wealthy land-owning family until the end of the American Civil War, when they lost a large amount of their assets, like many others in the southern plantation class. The family later entered politics and rebuilt their family's prominence through holding political office.

Richard Russell Sr. (1861–1938) served in various political and judicial offices including Chief Justice of the Georgia Supreme Court.

Two of his sons followed him into political and judicial office:

Richard Russell Jr. (1897-1971) served as Speaker of the Georgia House of Representatives, Governor of Georgia, and United States Senator.

Robert Lee Russell (1900–1955) was a lawyer and served as a Judge on the U.S. District Court, and later as a Judge on the U.S. Court of Appeals.

Richard Russell, Jr.'s nephew, Walter B. Russell Jr., served fifteen years in the U.S. Army followed by six years in the Georgia House of Representatives.

Russell family in-laws:

Ernest Vandiver (1918-2005) served as the Governor of Georgia. He was the husband of Betty Russell, a granddaughter of Richard Russell, Sr., a niece of Richard Russell, Jr. and the daughter of Robert Lee Russell.

Hugh Peterson (1898–1961) was a lawyer and served in the U.S. House of Representatives (1935-1947). He was the husband of Patience Elizabeth Russell, a daughter of Richard B. Russell, Sr.

References

Political families of the United States
American families
Families from Georgia (U.S. state)